Madhuca hainanensis is a species of plant in the family Sapotaceae. It is endemic to China. It is threatened by habitat loss.

References

Flora of China
hainanensis
Vulnerable plants
Taxonomy articles created by Polbot
Plants described in 1958